The 2011 World Taekwondo Championships was the 20th edition of the World Taekwondo Championships, and was held at Gyeongju Indoor Stadium in Gyeongju, South Korea from May 1 to May 6, 2011.

Medal table

Medal summary

Men

Women

Team ranking
Iran grabbed the men's overall title, It marked the first time that Korea failed to retain the men's overall title in the history of the biennial World Taekwondo Championships.

Men

Women

Participating nations 
According to the competition draws, 949 athletes from 144 nations competed.

 (5)
 (3)
 (6)
 (6)
 (4)
 (3)
 (15)
 (6)
 (16)
 (2)
 (2)
 (9)
 (2)
 (2)
 (2)
 (7)
 (15)
 (5)
 (2)
 (9)
 (16)
 (2)
 (9)
 (16)
 (16)
 (15)
 (7)
 (12)
 (3)
 (10)
 (2)
 (10)
 (4)
 (4)
 (13)
 (2)
 (5)
 (14)
 (3)
 (3)
 (3)
 (16)
 (3)
 (7)
 (14)
 (4)
 (10)
 (16)
 (2)
 (7)
 (1)
 (2)
 (5)
 (6)
 (13)
 (5)
 (3)
 (11)
 (14)
 (12)
 (5)
 (2)
 (6)
 (12)
 (2)
 (2)
 (8)
 (10)
 (15)
 (14)
 (2)
 (3)
 (2)
 (2)
 (6)
 (2)
 (5)
 (2)
 (4)
 (3)
 (2)
 (2)
 (7)
 (1)
 (16)
 (2)
 (11)
 (2)
 (13)
 (11)
 (4)
 (2)
 (12)
 (3)
 (1)
 (8)
 (1)
 (6)
 (6)
 (3)
 (3)
 (2)
 (1)
 (2)
 (1)
 (11)
 (6)
 (4)
 (13)
 (6)
 (3)
 (16)
 (2)
 (2)
 (2)
 (7)
 (8)
 (5)
 (2)
 (5)
 (3)
 (16)
 (16)
 (8)
 (3)
 (10)
 (3)
 (1)
 (7)
 (12)
 (4)
 (5)
 (4)
 (16)
 (2)
 (11)
 (5)
 (16)
 (13)
 (2)
 (15)
 (11)
 (2)
 (2)

References

External links
 Official website

 
World Championships
World Taekwondo Championships
International taekwondo competitions hosted by South Korea
World Taekwondo Championships
Gyeongju
Taekwondo competitions in South Korea